Marstal Parish is a parish in the Diocese of Funen in Ærø Municipality, Denmark. The parish contains Marstal, the municipality's largest town, and Ommel, a village.

References 

Parishes in Ærø Municipality
Parishes of Denmark